Couratari asterophora is a species of woody plant in the family Lecythidaceae. It is found only in Brazil. It is threatened by habitat loss.

References

asterophora
Flora of Brazil
Critically endangered plants
Taxonomy articles created by Polbot